Esparta is a municipality in the Honduran department of Atlántida.

External links
MUNICIPIO DE ESPARTA - SECRETARÍA DE GOBERNACIÓN Y JUSTICIA 

Municipalities of the Atlántida Department